Philip Sydney "Red" Ehret (August 31, 1868 – July 28, 1940) was a Major League Baseball pitcher who played from 1888 to 1898 for the Kansas City Cowboys, Louisville Colonels, Pittsburgh Pirates, St. Louis Browns, and Cincinnati Reds.

External links

1868 births
1940 deaths
Major League Baseball pitchers
Baseball players from Kentucky
19th-century baseball players
Louisville Colonels players
Pittsburgh Pirates players
Kansas City Cowboys players
St. Louis Browns (NL) players
Cincinnati Reds players
Denver (minor league baseball) players
St. Joseph Reds players
Austin Senators players
San Antonio (minor league baseball) players
Sioux City Corn Huskers players
Lincoln Rustlers players
Minneapolis Millers (baseball) players
Fort Wayne Railroaders players
Indianapolis Hoosiers (minor league) players
Memphis Egyptians players
Montgomery Senators players